There are six motorways in Luxembourg, forming the backbone of road infrastructure in Luxembourg.  Five of them extend radially from Luxembourg City, in southern Luxembourg, the centre of the transport network of the country.

The six motorways have a total length of 
.

History

In the Grand Duchy, the development of motorway projects had its beginnings in the late 1960s. The first sections made were the Kirchberg - Senningerberg sections of the A1 motorway and Pontpierre - Esch-sur-Alzette / Lallange sections of the A4 motorway. They were put into service in 1969, quickly followed by the A3 (Luxembourg - Dudelange) and A6 motorways towards Arlon.

In later 1980s and beginning of 1990s sections I to III of the A1 motorway to Trier (coming from the German border at Wasserbillig) were finalized, joining the A6 motorway by the Croix de Gasperich bypassing Luxembourg City in the south-east. The last completed is the A13 motorway oriented west-east between the Biff at Bascharage and Schengen, joining the new German A8 motorway.

In 2015, the last part of the A7 was inaugurated. It connects the north of the country in Schieren with the capital in Grünewald.

Naming 
The numbering of motorways is derived from the numbering of national roads. The first national roads were numbered according to the hands of a clock (around Luxembourg City), starting with the road to Trier, the road N1, until the road towards the North N7. With reference to this designation, the motorways are called A1 "Trier motorway" and A7 "Route du Nord".

List of motorways

See also
Transport in Luxembourg
List of controlled-access highway systems
Evolution of motorway construction in European nations

References

External links
  Administration des Ponts et Chaussées

 
Luxembourg, Motorways
Motorways
Motorways